William Alexander Anderson (28 July 1909 – 21 April 1975) was an English cricketer who played a single first-class cricket game for Free Foresters against Cambridge University Cricket Club in 1946.

References

English cricketers
Free Foresters cricketers
1909 births
1975 deaths